Cửa Lò is a district-level town of Nghệ An Province, in the North Central Coast region of Vietnam. As of 2018 the district had a population of 75,260. The district covers an area of 28 km² and it is located 290 km south of Hanoi, 1400 km north of Ho Chi Minh City and 16 km northeast of Vinh.

Etymology
By texts from Thiều Chửu and Dr. Lê Chí Quế, "cửa-lò" was a classical-Annamese pronunciation of Malayo-Polynesian word "kuala" which means the point where two rivers join or an estuary.

Tourist attractions

Hòn Ngư Island
Hòn Ngư Island is located in the sea, more than 4 km from the shore. The island consists of two small islands. The higher island is 133 m above sea level at its highest, with the lower island being 88 m above sea level at its highest. It has an area of 2.5 km2, convenient for sightseeing. On the island there is the so-called Bai Pagoda, built in the 13th century with pagodas and temples; the temple has an upper pagoda and a lower pagoda, and each pagoda has 3 roofs with yin and yang; the beams are carved with sacred objects (dragons, unicorns, turtles and phoenixes), while the garden has many natural green trees such as porcelain trees, fish poison trees, duoi trees and a fresh water well called Jade Gem. The temple has two fish poison trees, both about 700 years old. Currently, there is a project to build a cable car that will connect the island to the mainland.

Cửa Hội
Located 5 km from Cửa Lò along the beach, Cửa Hội is the place where the Lam River flows into the sea. From here, Hòn Ngư Island can be seen directly. This area is full of casuarina, and the sea here is still uncontaminated and quiet different from the busier atmosphere in Cửa Lò from Cửa Hội. It is possible to follow the Lam river bank through the Cham forest (where there is rich vegetation and animal species such as birds and reptiles).

Bãi Lữ
Bãi Lữ is a resort that contains sea, mountains and a forest.

Infrastructure

Airport 
Vinh International Airport is located 14 km from Cửa Lò, and is the fifth busiest airport in Vietnam. From this airport there are flights to and from Ho Chi Minh City, Hanoi, Nha Trang, Da Nang, Buon Ma Thuot, Pleiku and a few international flights connecting Vientiane and Bangkok.

Road traffic 
There are five roads connecting Cửa Lò and Vinh, the capital of Nghệ An. Tourists can take the bus (no. 1) to Vinh.

References

Populated places in Nghệ An province
Districts of Nghệ An province
County-level towns in Vietnam